Sandra Pešić (born 21 January 1971 in Split, SFR Yugoslavia) is a Croatian female professional basketball player.

External links
Profile at eurobasket.com

1971 births
Living people
Basketball players from Split, Croatia
Croatian women's basketball players
Small forwards
Power forwards (basketball)
Mediterranean Games silver medalists for Croatia
Competitors at the 2005 Mediterranean Games
Mediterranean Games medalists in basketball